Mohammad Istanbuli is a Syrian footballer who plays for Naft Al-Janoob.

Club career
Estanbeli played all his career in Syria before joining Saudi Pro league team Al Nasr Medina.
After playing half season for Al Nasr he joined Iran Pro League side Aluminium Hormozgan.

International career
Istanbuli played for the Syria national football team which reached the final of the 2005 West Asian Games.

References

 http://www.kooora.com/default.aspx?player=8829

1982 births
Living people
Syrian footballers
Syrian expatriate footballers
Expatriate footballers in Iraq
Expatriate footballers in Saudi Arabia
Syrian expatriate sportspeople in Saudi Arabia
Syrian expatriate sportspeople in Iraq
Syrian expatriate sportspeople in Iran
Al-Ansar FC (Medina) players
Al-Watani Club players
Footballers at the 2006 Asian Games
Sportspeople from Aleppo
Saudi Professional League players
Saudi First Division League players
Association football defenders
Asian Games competitors for Syria
Syrian Premier League players